International Journal of Research in Marketing (IJRM) is a quarterly peer-reviewed academic journal published by Elsevier. It is an official journal of the European Marketing Academy and the editor-in-chief is Martin Schreier. The Co-Editors are Renana Peres, David Schweidel and Alina Sorescu. The journal was established in 1984.

Abstracting and indexing
The journal is abstracted and indexed in:

According to the Journal Citation Reports, the journal has a 2021 impact factor of 8.047.

References

External links 
 

Marketing journals
English-language journals
Elsevier academic journals
Quarterly journals
Publications established in 1984